Hall Glacier is a glacier flowing north between Lidke Ice Stream and Nikitin Glacier into Stange Sound on the English Coast of Palmer Land. Named by the Advisory Committee on Antarctic Names in 2006 after Dann V. Hall, a U.S. Geological Survey (USGS) surveyor in support of the Ross Ice Shelf Project, 1976–77; team member, joint USGS-British Antarctic Survey Doppler Landsat Control Project, 1977–78, via Twin Otter aircraft and ship to discrete positions at Haag Nunataks, Orville Coast, the Antarctic Peninsula, Ronne Ice Shelf, Filchner Ice Shelf, Lyddan Island, Theron Mountains, Deception Island, Signy Island, Bird Island and South Georgia.

References

Glaciers of Palmer Land